Alexander Runciman (15 August 1736 – 4 October 1785) was a Scottish painter of historical and mythological subjects. He was the elder brother of John Runciman, also a painter.

Life
He was born in Edinburgh, and studied at the Foulis Academy, Glasgow. From 1750 to 1762 he was apprenticed to the landscape painter Robert Norie, later becoming a partner in the Norie family firm. He also worked as a stage painter for the Theatre Royal in Edinburgh.

In 1767 he went to Rome, where he spent five years. His brother John accompanied him, but died in Naples in the winter of 1768–69. During Runciman's stay in Italy he became acquainted with other artists such as Henry Fuseli and the sculptor Johan Tobias Sergel. Runciman's earliest efforts had been in landscape; he now turned to historical and imaginative subjects, exhibiting his Nausicaa at Play with her Maidens in 1767 at the Free Society of British Artists, Edinburgh.

On his return from Italy after a brief time in London, where in 1772 he exhibited in the Royal Academy, he settled in Edinburgh, and was appointed master of the Trustees' Academy. He was patronised by Sir James Clerk, whose hall at Penicuik House he decorated with a series of subjects from Ossian which took inspiration from Gavin Hamilton's Iliad pictures.  He also created various religious paintings and an altar-piece in the Cowgate Episcopal Church, Edinburgh, and easel pictures of Cymon and Iphigenia, Sigismunda Weeping over the Heart of Tancre, and Agrippina with the Ashes of Germanicus.

In 1773 he is listed as sharing a studio with a Mr McLarin at the foot of Old Assembly Close off the Royal Mile (facing what is now called the Cowgate).

He enjoyed a strong reputation as a landscape painter is his lifetime.

Runciman died in Edinburgh and is buried in Canongate Churchyard. The grave is unmarked but a stone plaque was erected by the RSA in 1866 on the west-facing wall of the church to his memory (also commemorating his brother John who died in Naples).

Known works
see
Robert Fergusson
East Lothian Landscape
Dunvegan Castle
The Blind Ossian Singing
Self portrait with John Brown
The Witches Showing MacBeth the Apparitions
Fingal Encounters Carbon Carglass
Agrippina with the Ashes of Germanicus
Hubert and Arthur
Agrippina Landing at Brundisium
A View near Perth
Italian River Landscape with a Hermit
David Steuart Erskine
Temple of the Sibyl at Tipoli
Murals in the east apse in St Patrick's Church South Gray's Close, Edinburgh.St Patrick's, Cowgate, Edinburgh

References

Duncan Macmillan, "Runciman, Alexander (1736–1785)", Oxford Dictionary of National Biography, Oxford University Press, 2004 accessed 25 June 2007

Further reading
 Macmillan, Duncan (1984), Scottish Painting: Ramsay to Raeburn, in Parker, Geoffrey (ed.), Cencrastus No. 17, Summer 1984, pp. 25 - 29, 

1736 births
1785 deaths
18th-century Scottish painters
Scottish male painters
Scottish landscape painters
Artists from Edinburgh
Scottish scenic designers
Burials at the Canongate Kirkyard